Zak Thomas Gilsenan (born 8 May 2003) is a professional footballer currently playing as a midfielder for English club Blackburn Rovers. Born in Australia, he has represented Australia and the Republic of Ireland at youth international level.

Club career
Born in Joondalup, Perth, Gilsenan started his career with local side Carramar Cougars, before joining Sorrento. In 2011, he was scouted and signed by A-League side Perth Glory. He attended a two-week training camp organised by English club Tottenham Hotspur, where he was named player of the tournament, and was invited to trial with the north-London side. During the trial, he was scouted by Spanish giants Barcelona, and would go on to move to the Catalonian side in 2012.

Despite captaining the Barcelona youth teams, his parents relocated to England after two years in Spain, and Gilsenan would again go on trial, this time with Liverpool. He signed for Liverpool in 2014. He suffered a run of injuries, which eventually ended his spell in Merseyside, and despite interest from Premier League sides, he signed for Blackburn Rovers at the age of sixteen.

He signed his first professional contract with Blackburn Rovers in May 2021. Later the same year, he suffered an ACL injury, which kept him out until June 2022.

International career
Eligible to represent both Australia and the Republic of Ireland, Gilsenan has represented both at international level. He scored on his debut for the Republic of Ireland under-19s in a 2–2 draw with Sweden.

References

2003 births
Living people
Irish people of Australian descent
Soccer players from Perth, Western Australia
Republic of Ireland association footballers
Republic of Ireland youth international footballers
Australian soccer players
Australia youth international soccer players
Association football midfielders
Sorrento FC players
Perth Glory FC players
FC Barcelona players
Liverpool F.C. players
Blackburn Rovers F.C. players
Republic of Ireland expatriate association footballers
Irish expatriate sportspeople in Spain
Expatriate footballers in Spain
Irish expatriate sportspeople in England
Expatriate footballers in England